The Jaguar XJR-6 is a Group C sports prototype race car, designed, developed and built by TWR, with the aim of competing, from 1985, in the World Sportscar Championship. A total of six Jaguar XJR-6s were built and they contested in the World Sportscar Championship until 1986, before Jaguar replaced them with the Jaguar XJR-8.

Racing History

Participated in the 1985 and 1986 seasons.
A victory in the 1986 1000 km of Silverstone with Eddie Cheever and Derek Warwick.
Participated in the 1986 24 Hours of Le Mans; all three cars that were entered ended up retiring.

Drivers
Gianfranco Brancatelli 
Martin Brundle 
Eddie Cheever 
Hurley Haywood 
Hans Heyer 
Alan Jones 
Jan Lammers 
John Nielsen 
Win Percy
Brian Redman
Jean Louis Schlesser 
Mike Thackwell 
Derek Warwick

References

External links

XJR-5
Group C cars
Rear mid-engine, rear-wheel-drive vehicles
24 Hours of Le Mans race cars
Sports prototypes